Bethel University is a private Christian university and seminary  in Arden Hills, Minnesota. It was founded in 1871 as a seminary and is affiliated with Converge. The university enrolls 5,600 students in undergraduate, graduate, and seminary programs. Its main campus is situated on about 290 acres on the east side of Lake Valentine just south of Interstate 694.

History
Bethel University has its origins in the Baptist Theological Union's Swedish Seminary (Baptist Union Theological Seminary), which was founded by Swedish Baptist pastor John Alexis Edgren in Chicago, Illinois in 1871. In 1914, the Baptist General Conference has become the school's main partner. The seminary merged with Bethel Academy and relocated its campus to Saint Paul, Minnesota. In 1931, the Academy became Bethel Junior College. The addition of a four-year liberal arts college program created Bethel College and Seminary in 1947. The school relocated from St. Paul to Arden Hills, Minnesota in 1972. In 2004, the institution changed its name to Bethel University.

Academics
The university offers degree programs through four different schools. The College of Arts and Sciences is its traditional undergraduate program, Bethel offers bachelor's degrees in 106 majors and emphases of study, 43 minors, and 11 pre-professional programs. The College of Adults & Professional Studies offers associate degrees, bachelor's degrees, and a number of certificate programs. Through its graduate school, Bethel offers ten master's degrees, including a physician assistant program, as well as a doctorate in educational leadership. Bethel also offers a number of graduate certificate programs and licenses.

The school's seminary, called Bethel Theological Seminary, is located primarily on the Arden Hills campus. It also has a location in San Diego and offers a number of fully online programs. It offers Master of Divinity (M.Div.) and Doctor of Ministry (D.Min.) degrees, along with several Master of Arts (MA) and certificate programs.

Accreditations 
Bethel has been accredited by the Higher Learning Commission since 1959. Its nursing program is approved by the Minnesota Board of Nursing. Bethel's business program is accredited by the Accreditation Council for Business Schools and Programs.

Arden Hills campus

Academic buildings
There are six main academic buildings located at the center of Bethel University's main campus in Arden Hills, Minnesota. They run from southwest to northeast and are connected on the first three floors by weather-protected skyways and tunnels.

Starting from the Southwest and running to the Northeast, the buildings are as follows (with abbreviations in parentheses): Benson Great Hall and Lundquist Community Life Center (CLC), Barnes Academic Center (BAC), Brushaber Commons (BC), Clauson Fine Arts Center (CC), Hagstrom Student Services Center (HC), and Robertson Physical Education Center (RC).

On-campus housing

Freshman residences 
There are four freshman residence halls on campus. Three—Bodien Hall, Getsch Hall, and Edgren Hall—encircle a cul-de-sac just south of the academic buildings, informally known as Freshman Hill. The fourth, Nelson Hall, is the largest of the freshman residences, and located nearby on the north side of the academic buildings. It is the oldest building on Bethel University's current campus in Arden Hills.

Residences for returning students 
Two residence halls, Arden Village and Lissner Hall, mostly house returning students. North Village, a collection of five buildings formerly used as housing for seminary students, houses returning students and offers a full kitchen in every suite. It is located at the far north end of the campus. Heritage Hall, opened in 1999, is a suite-style residence hall, housing juniors and seniors. Students enrolling after Fall 2019 must be 21 years of age prior to September 1 to live off-campus with the exception of those who commute from their parents’ home.

Brushaber Commons

The Brushaber Commons, a $30 million, 106,000-square foot student commons area, opened in 2009. The Brushaber Commons is named after retired Bethel President George K. Brushaber. In addition to serving as a gathering point for students, the commons includes a dining center, coffee shop, restaurant, campus store, office space, public meeting areas, and an admissions center.

Benson Great Hall 
Benson Great Hall, Bethel's performing arts center, is a 1,700-seat concert hall with a 4,000-pipe Blackinton organ located in the center of the Lundquist Community Life Center. This hall houses worship services, theatre productions, and can be rented by outside performers. Benson Hall has hosted a variety of events in the past, providing a venue for Saint Paul Chamber Orchestra, a location for high school graduations, and the 2018 Super Bowl Gospel Celebration. Benson Great Hall offers a green room, backstage dressing rooms and bathrooms, custom sound dampening, lighting, and set design for special events.

Student life
The university hymn is O God of Bethel, by Whose Hand by Philip Doddridge.  A morning prayer chapel service is offered each class day, as well as vespers on Sunday evenings, but attendance is no longer mandatory.

Covenant for Life Together 
All full-time students in the College of Arts and Sciences are expected to abide by the Covenant for Life Together. The Covenant is a lifestyle agreement that focuses on living a life of faith and personal morality. The Covenant emphasizes a respect for all persons and ethnic traditions and requires students to refrain from any sort of extramarital sex, homosexuality, pornography, gambling, illegal drugs, and tobacco in any form.

Under the Covenant for Life Together, students in the College of Arts and Sciences were initially prohibited from dancing or consuming alcohol year-round, but the rules were eventually relaxed to allow alcohol consumption when classes are not in session. Alcohol consumption by full-time students in the College of Arts and Sciences is still prohibited during the academic year.

Publications 
Bethel University has a student news publication, The Clarion, which is printed during the school year and distributed on campus as well as online.

Athletics
The Bethel University athletic teams are known as the Royals. The university competes at the NCAA Division III level in 18 intercollegiate sports and is a member of the Minnesota Intercollegiate Athletic Conference (MIAC).

Women's 
 Basketball
 Cross country
 Golf
 Ice hockey
 Soccer
 Softball
 Tennis
 Track and field
 Volleyball

Men's 
 Baseball
 Basketball
 Cross Country
 Football
 Golf
 Ice Hockey
 Soccer
 Tennis
 Track and Field

Facilities 
 Bethel University Arena is located at the National Sports Center in Blaine, Minnesota and has been the home of men's and women's hockey teams since 2007.
 Hargis Park, the home field of the Bethel University baseball team, opened in the spring of 2000. It features an entirely turf field, an outdoor turf batting cage, two clay bullpen mounds, major league length dugouts, press box, and inning-by-inning scoreboard in left field and capacity to over 500 spectators.
 Ona Orth Athletic Complex opened for play in the fall of 2003 and is home to Bethel's tennis, softball, and soccer teams. The facility includes a fast-pitch softball park, six tennis courts, and a soccer practice/game field with branded team building.
 Robertson Center Gymnasium has been the home of Bethel basketball and volleyball since 1972.
 Royal Stadium, the home of Bethel's football team, was built in 1995 and renovated in 2001.

Notable alumni

Undergraduate 
 Chad Anderson, Republican former member of the Minnesota House of Representatives
Bill Mounce, former director of the Greek program at Gordon-Conwell University and current board member on the Committee on Bible Translation.
 Jeff Hayden, Democratic-Farmer-Labor member of the Minnesota Senate; former member of the Minnesota House of Representatives
 Abigail and Brittany Hensel, dicephalic parapagus twins, stars of TLC's Abby & Brittany
 Joel Hodgson, creator of (and main character in) Mystery Science Theater 3000
 Randy Hultgren, Republican former member of Congress from Illinois
 Steven R. Jensen (1985), current Chief Justice of the South Dakota Supreme Court
 Randy Jessup, Republican member of the Minnesota House of Representatives
 Mark Johnson, Republican member of the Minnesota Senate
 Sheldon Johnson, Democratic-Farmer-Labor member of the Minnesota House of Representatives
 Peter Ludlow, a professor of philosophy at Northwestern University
 Dawson McAllister, talk-radio host
 Chris Meidt, Washington Redskins staff, 2007–2009
 Bob Merritt, Eagle Brook Church pastor and author
 Jeff Nelson, Major League Baseball umpire
 Doug Ohlson, abstract artist.
 Doug Pagitt, influential figure in the emergent discussion
 Sophy Parfin, entomologist
 Mary Pawlenty, former district court judge and wife of former Minnesota governor and presidential candidate, Tim Pawlenty
 Linda Runbeck, Republican member of the Minnesota House of Representatives; former member of the Minnesota Senate
 Kirk Stensrud, Republican former member of the Minnesota House of Representatives
 Ron Tschetter, former director of the Peace Corps
 Pam Wolf, Republican former member of the Minnesota Senate
 Harvey L. Wollman, Democratic former Governor of South Dakota

Seminary 
 Joshua Becker, minimalist writer
 Gary Smalley, prominent author, family counselor, and motivational speaker

Notable current and former faculty
 Leith Anderson, president of the National Association of Evangelicals
 Greg Boyd, theologian and pastor
 E. Earle Ellis, professor of theology
 Michael W. Holmes, professor of New Testament
 Steven Keillor, adjunct professor of history
 Alvera Mickelsen, former professor of journalism
 Roger E. Olson, former professor of theology
 Wayne Grudem, Theologian and New Testament Scholar
 John Piper, theologian and pastor
 Thomas R. Schreiner New Testament Scholar
 Andrew Rock, varsity track and field coach

See also
 List of colleges and universities in Minnesota
 Higher education in Minnesota

References

External links

 

 
Liberal arts colleges in Minnesota
Educational institutions established in 1871
History of Chicago
Universities and colleges in Ramsey County, Minnesota
1871 establishments in Minnesota
Private universities and colleges in Minnesota
Council for Christian Colleges and Universities
Baptist universities and colleges in the United States